Caecilius is a genus of Psocoptera from the family Caeciliusidae, the lizard barklice. Species are found all around the world.

References 

 Macfarlane, R.P., Maddison, P.A., Andrew, I.G., Berry, J.A., Johns, P.M., Hoare, R.J.B., Larivière, M.-C., Greenslade, P., Henderson, R.C., Smithers, C.N., Palma, R.L., Ward, J.B., Pilgrim, R.L.C., Towns, D.R., McLellan, I., Teulon, D.A.J., Hitchings, T.R., Eastop, V.F., Martin, N.A., Fletcher, M.J., Stufkens, M.A.W., Dale, P.J., Burckhardt, D., Buckley, T.R. & Trewick, S.A. 2010. Phylum Arthropoda subphylum Hexapoda: Protura, springtails, Diplura, and insects. Pp. 233–467 in: Gordon, D.P. (ed.) 2010. New Zealand inventory of biodiversity. Volume 2. Kingdom Animalia. Chaetognatha, Ecdysozoa, ichnofossils. Canterbury University Press, Christchurch, New Zealand
 Ward, J.B. et al. 1999: Insects and other arthropods of Hinewai Reserve, Banks Peninsula, New Zealand. Records of the Canterbury Museum, 13: 97-121

External links 
 

 
 
 Caecilius at insectoid.info

Caeciliusidae
Psocomorpha genera